Floure is a commune in the Aude department in southern France. The journalist and writer Gaston Bonheur (1913–1980) is buried in Floure where he owned the castle.

Population

See also
 Corbières AOC
 Communes of the Aude department

References

Communes of Aude
Aude communes articles needing translation from French Wikipedia